Brahmapuri (Nepali: ब्रह्मपुरी) is a rural municipality in Sarlahi District, a part of Madhesh Province in Nepal. It was formed in 2016 occupying current 7 sections (wards) from previous 7 former VDCs. It occupies an area of 40.56 km2 with a total population of 39,169.

References

Populated places in Sarlahi District
Rural municipalities of Nepal established in 2017
Rural municipalities in Madhesh Province